The Neet Covered Bridge is a Burr Arch single span structure that was built by Joseph J. Daniels in 1904 over Little Raccoon Creek southwest of Rockville, Indiana.

It was added to the National Register of Historic Places in 1978.

History
This was the last bridge contracted by Joseph J. Daniels, he was 78 at the time, though he may have been the builder of the Roseville-Coxville Covered Bridge built 6 years later that had been contracted by J.P. Van Fossen. He would have been 84 years old by this time.

The 1908 Atlas of Parke County doesn't show any property near the bridge being owned by anyone in the Neet family while Enoch Shrigley referred to it as the Joe Neet Bridge. Joseph W. Neet had been born in 1862 and owned 176 acres in section 33, the bridge is on the west side of section 33. George M. Neet, born in 1869, rented 20 acres north of the bridge. Robert E. Detrich later owned property at the bridge through 1959 and by 1990 owned 40 acres further from the bridge which is listed as Detrich Tree Farm.

The Central Indiana Railroad crossed Little Raccoon Creek just north of the bridge.

On March 25, 1989 Rockville Boy Scout Troop 469 repainted the bridge with 4 gallons of paint. A note on the bridge credits Ted Gahimer, Bruce Girdler, Matt Garrett, and Shawn Taylor as the painters. As of 2010 the bridge and area around it were being maintained by neighbors Bob Lowdermilk and John Tilton.

See also
 List of Registered Historic Places in Indiana
 Parke County Covered Bridges
 Parke County Covered Bridge Festival

References

Covered bridges on the National Register of Historic Places in Parke County, Indiana
Bridges completed in 1904
Bridges Built by J. J. Daniels
Wooden bridges in Indiana
Burr Truss bridges in the United States
1904 establishments in Indiana